A  or professional stand-in service provides clients with actor(s) who portray friends, family members, or coworkers for social events such as weddings, or to provide platonic companionship. The service was first offered in Japan during the early 1990s.

History
Hired crowds date back at least to the time of Emperor Nero, who reputedly required soldiers to attend and cheer on his performances. The earliest known rental family service was offered by Japan Efficiency Corporation (Nihon Kokasei Honbu) starting in the fall of 1991. Japan Efficiency, run by Satsuki Oiwa, was started in 1987 to train corporate employees, but after hearing complaints about unsatisfactory relationships, began to also offer professional actors for "soft service — reaching others with a sympathetic heart". By May 1992, Japan Efficiency had a roster of 21 clients, a waiting list of 84 more, and more than 400 applicants for professional stand-ins.

Some of the rental family agencies felt the services offered were uniquely suited to aspects of Japanese culture such as saving face and social etiquette, but the practice has since spread to other countries. Wedding guest rentals started in the late 1990s in South Korea, which offers a similar cultural desire to offer a public image of doing well. Korean rental services expanded to broader roles in the 2000s. In 2007, the Super-grandparents site was created in France to match children with surrogate grandparents for terms varying from one month to one year. After reading a 2009 news article regarding the service, Scott Rosenbaum founded the United States-based Rent-a-Friend in October 2009, a worldwide service which provides paying subscribers with contact information for local platonic companions who can be hired at rates set by the companion.

By 2009, there were around ten rental family service agencies in Japan. In 2010, CNN reported that some Chinese companies were hiring foreigners to serve as ersatz employees and partners, implying the presence of overseas business connections. The practice was known as "White Guy Window Dressing", "White Guy in a Tie", or a "Face Job" by the actors being hired. Companies are able to encourage real estate investment because the mere presence of foreigners outside the major cities imply that region is attracting international attention.

Some personal advertisements in China offered rental services to serve as partners so the client's parents would not worry about their continued single status, especially at holidays. The legal status of such rentals is questionable in China, where it is legal to offer services and labor, but the "body [cannot be rented] as the subject of a [business] contract". Some of the friend rental platforms were noted to potentially facilitate prostitution, which is illegal in China.

Service examples

Office Agents, a Tokyo-based company, offered wedding guests at a base price of  each in 2009, charging an additional  for the professional guest to sing or dance, and an additional  for a heartfelt speech. For one wedding, which was the groom's second marriage, Office Agents provided all thirty family, friend, and coworker guests of the groom, who did not want to invite the same people from his first marriage. The company stated it received 100 wedding requests per year and could call on a group of 1,000 actors.

The company Family Romance launched the "Real Appeal" service in 2017. "Real Appeal" provided clients with actors to pose with the client in photographs meant to be shared later on social media. The service was designed to boost the client's perceived popularity.

Although the phenomenon of social isolation (hikikomori) is well-publicized in Japan and some families have hired rental friends to break that isolation, other clients are not withdrawn but are merely seeking a relationship not defined by societal expectations, i.e., a sympathetic or confessional ear.

In some cases, the rental includes guests and groom.

Another company, Ikemeso Takkyūbin, offers a service to induce people to cry, thereby achieving a sense of catharsis. The name of the company translates to "handsome men weeping delivery" or "tear couriers", as their first service offered was a ceremony to mark the end of a marriage, and their female clientele felt their emotions were heightened by an attractive man to wipe away their tears.

Commentary
David McNeill wrote, for The Independent, the loss of lifetime employment opportunities had broken professional relationships, where "many companies were family-like affairs where workers spent most of their lives and knew their bosses" and family life in Japan had similarly fractured: "A growing number of people are putting off marriage or children and leading atomised, lonely lives in cramped urban apartments." In 1992, Erma Bombeck wrote about Japan Efficiency and drew parallels to the decline of family relationships in America, noting "There was a time in the world when we acknowledged that we needed one another and we had responsibilities toward these needs. [...] Now we are independent of one another and too busy to deal with one another's problems."

In popular culture
 Can't Buy Me Love, a 1987 American film in which the wealthy yet unpopular protagonist hires a popular classmate to pose as his girlfriend.
 My Best Friend's Wedding, a 1997 American film in which the protagonist asks a friend to pose as her fiance to make another friend jealous.
 Rent a Friend, a 2000 Dutch film in which the protagonist rents his services as a friend by the hour after being dumped by his girlfriend for his lack of ambition.
 Noriko's Dinner Table, a 2006 Japanese film about a 17-year-old girl, Noriko Shimabara, who runs away from her family and hometown, to Tokyo, where she joins a rental family company, I.C. Corp.

 Rent-A-Girlfriend, a manga series about a college student who rents a girlfriend to keep up appearances with his grandmother and friends.
 Family Romance, LLC, a 2019 film by Werner Herzog starring Yuichi Ishii, founder of rental family and friend service Family Romance.
 The Wedding Ringer, a 2015 film about a guy who hires someone to be his best man at a wedding

See also
 Crowds on Demand, a service company that provides paid actors to augment crowds
 Extra (acting), a performer in a film, television show, stage, musical, opera or ballet production, who appears in a nonspeaking or nonsinging (silent) capacity, usually in the background
 Ghost followers, inactive social media accounts to pad follower statistics
 Girlfriend/boyfriend experience, the person is hired to act like a significant other, but it also involves sex work
 Professional mourning

References

External links
 
 
 
 
 
 
 
 English translation: 
 
 English translation by Valentina Crosato: 
 
 
 
 

Service retailing
Japanese culture